Ethiroli is a 1970 Indian Tamil-language legal drama film, directed by K. Balachander, starring Sivaji Ganesan. It was the only collaboration between Balachander and Ganesan. The film was released on 27 June 1970.

Plot 

The story revolves around Advocate Shankar, who gives his daughter 7 principles to follow. However, in a critical case that he takes up, Shankar ends up violating each principle, leading to misery in both his case and personal life. The film concludes with his daughter gifting him the same 7 principles, which he intends to follow once again.

Cast 
 Sivaji Ganesan as Advocate Shankar
 K. R. Vijaya as Vijaya
 S. S. Rajendran as Raju
 Jyothi Lakshmi as Shanti
 Sivakumar as Sundaram
 Lakshmi as Kalpana
 Major Sundarrajan as Manickam
 V. S. Raghavan as Public Prosecutor
 T. S. Balaiah as Singapur Minor Balaiya
 Nagesh as Krishna Rao
 G. Sakunthala as Radhamani
 Rojaramani as Raji
 O. A. K. Thevar as Thevar
 Vijaya Lalitha as Valli
 Peeli Sivam as Doctor
 S. R. Prabhakar as Chittor

Themes 
Ethiroli revolves around the "moral decay of men".

Soundtrack 
The music was composed by K. V. Mahadevan, with lyrics by Vaali.

Release and reception 
Ethiroli was released on 27 June 1970. The Indian Express wrote, "this is quite a different movie. It makes a fairly successful and quite an interesting study of blackmailer and the blackmailed".

References

External links 

1970 films
1970s Tamil-language films
Films directed by K. Balachander
Films scored by K. V. Mahadevan
Films with screenplays by K. Balachander
Indian courtroom films
Indian legal drama films